Disclaimer is an upcoming American psychological thriller miniseries written and directed by Alfonso Cuarón, based on the 2015 novel of the same name by Renée Knight.

Premise
A famed television journalist discovers she is a prominent character in a novel that reveals a secret she has tried to keep hidden.

Cast
 Cate Blanchett as Catherine Ravenscroft
 Kevin Kline as Stephen Brigstocke
 Sacha Baron Cohen as Robert
 Kodi Smit-McPhee as Nick
 Louis Partridge as Jonathan 
 HoYeon Jung as Kim
 Lesley Manville as Nancy
 Liv Hill as Sasha
 Gemma Jones as Helen
 Leila George as Young Catherine

Production
It was announced in December 2021 that Apple TV+ had ordered the series, which will be written and directed by Alfonso Cuarón, with Cate Blanchett and Kevin Kline set to star. Emmanuel Lubezki and Bruno Delbonnel will serve as cinematographers for the series. In February 2022, Kodi Smit-McPhee joined the cast while Sacha Baron Cohen entered negotiations for a role. Cohen would be confirmed the next month, with HoYeon Jung also added to the cast. In May, Louis Partridge would join the cast, with Lesley Manville joining the next month. Leila George was added to the cast in October.

Filming for the series had begun by June 2022 in Archway, London and finished production in February 2023.

References

External links

Upcoming television series
American thriller television series
Apple TV+ original programming
Television series about journalism
Television series about television
Television series based on novels
Television series by Anonymous Content
Television shows about writers
Television shows shot in London
Works by Alfonso Cuarón